Nic Felgen (13 September 1920 – 21 April 1972) was a Luxembourgian wrestler. He competed in the men's Greco-Roman welterweight at the 1948 Summer Olympics.

References

External links
 

1920 births
1972 deaths
Luxembourgian male sport wrestlers
Olympic wrestlers of Luxembourg
Wrestlers at the 1948 Summer Olympics
People from Differdange